Mendy Pellin is an American Chabad Hasidic comic with a web-based satirical news show called The Mendy Report.

Pellin was born to a Hasidic family in Denver, Colorado. He spent most of his childhood in Crown Heights, Brooklyn, New York, home of the Chabad-Lubavitch movement.

Mendy is also co-writer for a sitcom (release date unknown). Mendy and his wife, Shulamit, married at the end of March 2007. He has appeared on The Tonight Show with Jay Leno.

He acted in the independent film "A Modest Suggestion (Film)".

See also 
 Meir Kay
 Ayelet the Kosher Komic
 Adina Sash

References

External links

The Jewish Journal
Carroll County Times
The Jewish Week
 http://online.wsj.com/articles/this-rabbi-raps-and-riffson-judaism-1415919919

Living people
Jewish American comedians
American male comedians
21st-century American comedians
Hasidic entertainers
Chabad-Lubavitch Hasidim
American Hasidim
Male actors from Denver
People from Crown Heights, Brooklyn
Year of birth missing (living people)
Orthodox and Hasidic Jewish comedians
Jewish American male comedians